In gridiron football, replay review is a method of reviewing a play using cameras at various angles to determine the accuracy of the initial call of the officials. An instant replay can take place in the event of a close or otherwise controversial call, either at the request of a team's head coach (with limitations) or the officials themselves.

Replay reviews are utilized in some high school games, and also for many games at the college level and above.  Before the 2019 season, the National Federation of State High School Associations (NFHS), which establishes the rules for most high school and youth organizations in the United States (though not for Texas high schools), did not allow replay reviews even when the equipment exists to enable the practice. Effective in 2019, NFHS gave its member associations the option to allow replay review, but only in postseason games.  In those leagues that utilize replay reviews, there are restrictions on what types of plays can be reviewed. In general, most penalty calls or lack thereof cannot be reviewed, nor can a play that is whistled dead by the officials before the play could come to its rightful end.

American and Canadian football leagues vary in their application and use of instant replay review.

By league

National Football League

The NFL first adopted a limited Instant Replay system in 1986. It remained in place through 1991. The current system was put into use in 1999, adding the opportunity to "challenge" on-field calls of plays. The current system mirrors a system used by the now defunct USFL in its final season, 1985. Each coach is allowed two opportunities per game to make a coach's challenge. Starting in 2004, the rule was amended to award a third challenge if both of the original two challenges were successful.

A challenge can be made on certain reviewable calls on plays that begin before the two-minute warning and only when a team has at least one timeout remaining in the half. Up until the 2005 season, coaches could signal a challenge via an electronic pager, now used only by the replay assistant. The coach now throws a red flag onto the field, indicating the challenge to the referees. This red flag was originally the "backup plan" if the pager were to fail, but over time proved to be prompter and more popular, as it showed the immediate and visual intent of the coach to ask for a review rather than a silent pager request without a visual indicator.

The referee has up to 90 seconds to watch the instant replay of the play and decide if the original call was correct. The referee must see "incontrovertible visual evidence" that the original call was incorrect for a call to be overturned. If the challenge fails, the original ruling stands, and the challenging team is charged with a timeout. If the challenge overrules the previous call, the call is reversed; should there have been an official score change, the score will be changed again, resulting in the original score and with no loss of a timeout.

Initially, the referee departed the field of play to a covered booth equipped with a CRT television monitor to consult the video replays. Over time, the equipment was upgraded, first to high-definition, then to touch screen monitors under the hood. Eventually the booth was abandoned in favor of portable Microsoft Surface tablets held by an assistant.

Because of the limited number of challenges, and the possible penalty of a lost timeout, coaches typically reserve their challenges for key plays. A questionable call may not be challenged once the next play is underway, so coaches may be forced to make a quick decision without the benefit of seeing a replay on television or on the stadium screen.  If a questionable call is made in favor of the offense, then the offense will often line up and snap the ball quickly to prevent the opposing coach from challenging the call.  Often players on the field will signal to the coach if they believe the play should be challenged.

For plays inside the two-minute warning of each half, all plays during overtime, scoring plays (since 2011), and turnovers (since 2012), reviews can take place only if the replay official, who sits in the press box and monitors the network broadcast of the game, determines that a play needs review; coaches may not challenge during these times. In those cases, the replay official will contact the referee by a specialized electronic pager with a vibrating alert. If a review takes place during that time while the clock is running, the clock will stop for the review, and then it will start running once the ball is set and ready for play. Starting with the 2010 season (and later in 2017), any reviews with the clock running inside one minute (now inside the two-minute warning) will incur a 10-second runoff, which can be avoided if either team uses a timeout.

One concern about replay that was addressed some years ago was the situation where a coach sought a review of a non-challengeable call (such as being forced out of bounds, or in some cases to challenge a runner down by contact). Before the rule was clarified, a team lost the challenge and a time-out. The current rule does not penalize a team in such a case, provided the rule is not abused or taken advantage of.

The NFL replay system currently only covers the following situations:
Scoring plays
Pass complete/incomplete/intercepted
Runner/receiver out of bounds
Recovery of a loose ball in or out of bounds
Touching of a forward pass, either by an ineligible receiver or a defensive player
Quarterback pass or fumble
Illegal forward pass
Forward or backward pass
Runner ruled not down by contact
Forward progress in regard to a first down
Touching of a kick
Other plays involving placement of the football
Whether a legal number of players is on the field at the time of the snap
Ejections

If a play is overturned, the official is also responsible for making any related revisions to the game clock if applicable, especially in late, game-ending situations. For instance, if a player makes a reception and runs a long distance, several seconds may run off the game clock. If the play is challenged and the catch overturned, the game clock is reset to have stopped at the moment of incompletion, adding time back to the clock.

Note that the spot of the ball may be challenged in certain cases. In such cases, a decision to respot the football is not enough to win the challenge; only when the ball is respotted and the ruling on the field is reversed by remeasurement is the challenging team not charged a timeout.

Some unusual, and confusing sequences of events can occur during replay stoppages, and most have been addressed through rules clarifications. For instance, if a team commits a delay of game penalty (before the snap), the opposing team still has the opportunity to challenge, provided it is done before the ensuing snap. Also, inside the two-minute warning, if a team calls a timeout in the normal course of play, but the replay official calls for a challenge of that play, the initial timeout is ignored and restored in favor of the replay stoppage.

On occasion, challenges can sometimes backfire on teams. During a 2017 rivalry game between the Chicago Bears and Green Bay Packers, Bears head coach John Fox challenged a call that had ruled Bears running back Benny Cunningham down at the Packers two-yard line despite Cunningham extending his arm out and touching the pylon, which under NFL rules rule it a touchdown. While the Bears won the challenge, the referees actually ruled that Cunningham lost control of the football before being down and fumbled the ball into and out of the end zone, which by NFL rules resulted in a touchback and a turnover to the Packers. Although the Packers punted on the ensuing drive, it turned out to be a key play in what was a 23–16 Packers win. Since the Bears did get the play overturned (albeit with unintended results), they weren't charged a timeout, giving the Bears a Pyrrhic victory.

Beginning in 2014, all replays reviews are overseen centrally at the league's headquarters in New York. Consultants at "Art McNally GameDay Central" monitor all games across the league and queue up the best replay angles and directly assist the referee in making the decision. The move streamlines the process and assures that reviews are consistent across the league. It was loosely inspired by a similar setup employed by the NHL. It allows input from multiple experts, to ensure that rules are enforced properly and that no rules are accidentally overlooked. Previously, the on-site game referee was the sole arbiter of the review (with input only from the replay official). The new system eases the burden on the game referee, allowing the crew assembled in New York to do most of the video examination in an isolated, controlled environment, allowing the referee to focus on the on-site mechanics of the process. As technology has improved, starting in 2022 the NFL now has what it calls "expedited review" where if either the replay official or New York sees an obvious error, they are allowed to communicate to the referee through his headset to correct the error.

History
The current replay system replaced a previous system used from 1986 through 1991, when a procedure similar to that of what college football uses today was used. In 1987 commissioner Pete Rozelle saved the system for another season; in 1988 Pittsburgh Steelers owner Dan Rooney saved it. Before 1986, and from 1992 to 1998, no replay system was used. While there is occasional controversy over the appropriateness of overturned calls, the system is generally accepted as an effective and necessary way to ensure a fair game.

By consensus, the tipping point for replay being fully and permanently accepted by NFL owners came late in the 1998 season. The Seattle Seahawks were leading the New York Jets with time running out and the Jets facing a 4th-and-goal situation, when QB Vinny Testaverde evaded a pass rush and ran towards the end zone before diving near the goal line. The referee near the play called it a touchdown, giving the Jets a critical 32–31 win. However, replays showed very clearly that while Testaverde's helmet had crossed the goal line, the football never came close to breaking the plane of the goal line as required by the rules. If Seattle had won this game and the rest of their schedule played out as it ended up doing, they would have earned a wild card spot, but instead they missed the playoffs and coach Dennis Erickson and his entire staff were fired after the season. Owners could no longer claim that the inability to address such a massive error was tenable, and brought replay back for the 1999 season. Replay has remained (with numerous adjustments) part of the NFL since then.

Despite the rules that a play cannot be challenged if another play was run, it has happened on at least one occasion under the current rules. In 2001, the Cleveland Browns were driving toward the east end zone of Cleveland Browns Stadium against the Jacksonville Jaguars for what would have been the winning score. A controversial call on fourth down gave the Jaguars the ball. Browns' receiver Quincy Morgan had caught a pass for a first down on 4th and 1. After Tim Couch spiked the ball on the next play, referee Terry McAulay reviewed Morgan's catch, claiming that the replay officials had buzzed him before Couch spiked the ball. Upon reviewing the play, McAulay determined that Morgan never had control of the ball, thus the pass was incomplete, and the Jaguars were awarded the ball via turnover on downs. Fans in the Dawg Pound began throwing plastic beer bottles and other objects on the field, in an incident dubbed "Bottlegate". McAulay declared the game over and sent the teams to the locker rooms. NFL Commissioner Paul Tagliabue then called to override the referee's decision to end the game, sending the players back onto the field, where the Jaguars ran out the last seconds under a hail of debris. The loss had major playoff implications for the Browns, who dropped to 6-7, although the Browns would have still missed the playoffs even if they won the game.

For the 2019 NFL season, pass interference became reviewable as a response to the 2018 NFC Championship Game. However, after every pass interference challenge or review failed to overturn a single ruling, the rule was not kept in place for 2020.

NCAA football

In 2006, the NCAA Football Rules Committee enacted instant replay guidelines and added them to the football playing rules. For games involving two schools from the same conference, league policy determines whether replay will be used. For non-conference games, the home team makes the determination.

Plays involving the sideline, goal line, end zone and end line, as well as other detectable situations, are reviewable (e.g., fumble/no fumble, pass complete/incomplete, touchdown/no touchdown, runner down/not down, player or ball inbounds/out of bounds, clock adjustments). Most fouls (e.g., holding, offside, pass interference) are not reviewable, except that in 2006, illegal forward passes, handoffs and punts from beyond the line of scrimmage, and too many players on the field are reviewable and the foul may be called after replay review. Also, while the foul of pass interference is not reviewable, it can be overturned on review based on touching of the pass. By rule, pass interference cannot apply if a pass has been touched by any player before the foul occurs, and the touching of a pass is a reviewable play at its conclusion from a secure booth in the press box. Most plays are routine and the game continues without interruption. If, however, the following criteria are met, the Replay Official may interrupt the contest by paging the game officials to stop the game before the next play starts. The criteria are:

There is reasonable evidence to believe an error was made in the initial on-field ruling.
The play is reviewable.
Any reversal of the on-field ruling, which can only result from indisputable video evidence, would have a direct, competitive impact on the game.

Once per game, each head coach may also call a timeout and challenge the ruling on the previous play before the next play starts. A coach must have at least one timeout remaining in order to challenge (teams receive three timeouts per half). If the challenge is successful and the on-field ruling is overturned, the team keeps its timeout and is allowed only one more challenge. If unsuccessful, the team loses its timeout and is allowed no more challenges.

After reviewing the play from available video angles, the Replay Official decides if the call should be upheld or overturned.  If the call is overturned, the Replay Official provides the proper information to restart the play, such as the team in possession, the yard line where the ball should be placed, the correct down and distance, and the correct time on the stadium clock. Should there have been an official score change, the score will be changed again, resulting in the original score.

History
College football instant replay was started by the Big Ten Conference in the 2004 season, because of what happened in the 2000 Michigan vs. Illinois football game, when reviews were used experimentally in the Big Ten Conference only. In the 2005 season, all conferences were allowed to use instant replay. Among Division I Football Bowl Subdivision (see Division I-A) conferences, the Atlantic Coast Conference, Big East (since succeeded in football by the American Athletic Conference), Big Ten, Big 12, Conference USA, MAC, Mountain West Conference, Pac-10, and SEC used replay in 2005. The Sun Belt and Western Athletic (the latter of which did not sponsor football from 2013–2020, and now plays FCS football) did not.

In 2005, the Big 12 initially sought to provide field monitors to allow the on-field referee to assist the replay official; however, by the first game of the season, they decided to only provide equipment to the instant replay booth.  Conference USA used a similar system, but the on-field referee made the decision after viewing a TV monitor on the sideline. The Mountain West Conference was the only league to allow a head coach's challenge.  Each head coach got one challenge per half. If the call was overturned, the challenging coach kept his timeout and got a second challenge for that half. If not, the challenging coach lost one of his three timeouts for the half. No more than two challenges per half per coach were allowed.

There is not currently an instant replay equipment standard, each conference must choose (and purchase) its own equipment. Therefore, systems are quite disparate: they can be as complex as the high-tech custom systems similar as those used in the NFL to as simple as several large screens hooked to a digital video recorder using the direct-to-air feed of the broadcasting entity televising the game or a venue's internal coverage unit. Television coverage of NCAA games varies widely depending on the athletic conference, with most lower-level games not televised at all and many middle-level games only covered through rudimentary local or Internet broadcasts; the quality of replay camera angles thus varies accordingly.

In 2005, the Big Ten, MAC, and SEC only allowed broadcast video (for games that are televised) to be used to determine the correct call. The other conferences allowed broadcast video and scoreboard video. Most conferences provided video equipment for games that were not televised.

Instant replay was used in post-season games for the first time in the 2005 season. It was used in all 28 bowl games as well as the Division I Football Championship Subdivision (FCS, née I-AA), Division II and Division III national championship playoff games.

High school football
While NFHS rules prohibited the use of instant replay before 2019, Texas uses NCAA rules as its base set, allowing for the possibility of replay reviews. Through the 2018 season, Massachusetts also based its rules on those of the NCAA, but the state's governing body adopted NFHS rules effective with the 2019 season.

In Texas, the governing body for public-school sports, the University Interscholastic League (UIL), allows replay only in televised state championship games, and only if approved beforehand by the UIL. The UIL's list of reviewable plays is identical that of the NCAA. However, the UIL's rule differs in that coaches cannot challenge calls, replay officials cannot create targeting fouls that were not called on the field, and the UIL does not provide for collaborative replay experiments. By contrast, the main governing body for non-public schools, the Texas Association of Private and Parochial Schools, follows the pre-2019 NFHS rules in banning replay review.

Canadian Football League

The Canadian Football League board of governors approved the use of instant replay starting in 2006. When implemented, the CFL system appeared to be modeled largely on the NFL's, although some differences had been incorporated to accommodate differences between the two codes.

CFL teams are allowed only one challenge per game. A team must have at least one timeout in order to challenge, unless the challenge occurs in overtime, in which a team does not need a timeout in order to challenge a play. If a challenge is not successful, a timeout is charged. Regardless of the outcome, teams do not get any additional challenges. After the two minute warning in the fourth quarter, unused challenges are lost for the remainder of the game.

The current rule was instituted by new CFL commissioner Randy Ambrosie in August 2017 and took immediate effect. Ambrosie said in a statement that fans had been very clear they wanted a change concerning the video review system. He added that "Too many challenges and reviews are interrupting the game," and the last thing the game needs is an "artificial impediment" to the fans' enjoyment.

Previously, the CFL rules were similar to the NFL in that teams were allowed two challenges per game, with a third challenge awarded if both challenges were successful. Prior to 2013, when CFL teams were only allowed one timeout per half, a timeout was charged only if the team's second challenge was not successful.

Another dramatic difference between CFL and NFL replay rules is that the CFL allows replay review of certain judgment calls. Since 2014, defensive pass interference situations have been reviewable, with replay officials authorized to overturn called fouls even if the pass had not been touched before the foul, and also to impose fouls that were not called on the field. Notably, the Edmonton Eskimos scored what proved to be the game-winning touchdown in the 2015 Grey Cup after they had successfully challenged an incompletion during the scoring drive on the grounds of a missed pass interference call. The CFL added several other penalties, among them offensive pass interference, illegal contact, and roughing the kicker or passer, to its list of reviewable calls in 2016. These penalties can only be reviewed if challenged by a coach—replay officials have no authority to review penalties during automatic review situations, or after the three-minute warning in the fourth quarter.

The CFL Command Centre in Toronto has replay officials which conduct all reviews, rather than using a booth on the sidelines. Replay officials review all challenges, all scoring plays (including open-field plays that could have resulted in a touchdown), all unsuccessful convert attempts, and turnovers stemming from fumbles or interceptions. They can also initiate a review for all plays after the three-minute warning in the fourth quarter. There is no time limit to make a decision.

USPORTS football

In 2017, the Ontario University Athletics (OUA) Governance and Nominations Committee ruled that the OUA would be the first conference in USPORTS football to allow the use of video sideline replay. By 2018, sideline instant replay software was being used by teams across the OUA conference and in 2019 all USPORTS conferences officially made the decision to allow sideline instant replay.

Sideline instant replay is used almost entirely as a coaching tool at the USPORTS level,  as video instant replay is not used by officials to review calls in real-time at the USPORTS level.

Video replay is used by the referees and governing bodies, only with the interest of improving safety and deterring egregious actions within sport. For this intent, videos that demonstrate an egregious offence within sport must undergo the appropriate video submission process whereby a Member must provide a written request to review the incident, to the Conference’s Chief Operating Officer, and copy the opposing institution within 48 hours after the conclusion of the game/contest.

A review completed by a Chief Operating Officer will only occur if one or many of the following cases has occurred during a game:

 A violent/dangerous act resulting in serious injury accompanied with potential for significant lost playing time.

 An act that meets the definition of Reckless Disregard

 Conduct of a person or coach which violates the OUA Code of Conduct and Ethics.

Once the review has concluded, the Chief Operating Officer will provide a report stating whether or not a violation occurred. This decision is final and cannot be appealed. If the behaviour under review is deemed to have been a violation, the Officer may impose sanctions reflecting the severity of the action, which are effective immediately. If it is determined by the Officer that no violation has occurred, the matter is resolved.

References 

American football terminology
Canadian football